Thomas Matthias Klapötke (born 24 February 1961 in Göttingen) is a German inorganic chemist at Ludwig Maximilian University of Munich, studying explosives.

Klapötke grew up in Berlin and studied at the Technical University of Berlin (TU Berlin), completing his undergraduate degree in 1982, his PhD in 1986, and his habilitation in 1990.  Klapötke worked as a lecturer at TU Berlin until 1995, when the University of Glasgow hired him for the Ramsay professorship.  Since 1997, Klapötke has worked at the Ludwig Maximilian University of Munich (LMU) as a professor of Inorganic Chemistry.

Klapötke's lab at the University of Munich is a group of about 30 employees, mainly studying explosives. Klapötke's goal is to generate "green" explosives, that either burn to completion or leave few toxic residues.  Die Zeit called it "the only university laboratory in Germany investigating implements of war".  For this reason, the Federal Office for the Protection of the Constitution watches Klapötke's lab quite closely.  Klapötke is funded both by the German federal government and the US military and has won a number of awards, including the 1986 Schering Prize.

Klapötke is a vegetarian.

References

External links
 

1961 births
Living people
Inorganic chemists
20th-century German chemists
21st-century German chemists